ECG may refer to:

Science and medicine 
 Electrocardiogram
 Electrocardiography
 Epicatechin gallate
 Equine chorionic gonadotropin

Other uses 
 The Early College at Guilford, in Greensboro, North Carolina, United States
 East Central German, a dialect of German
 East Coast Greenway, a long-distance trail in the United States
 Electricity Company of Ghana
 Elizabeth City Regional Airport, in North Carolina, United States
 Environment Conservation Group, an Indian conservation organization
 Essex County Ground, a cricket ground in Chelmsford, England